The 1938–39 United States collegiate men's ice hockey season was the 45th season of collegiate ice hockey in the United States.

Regular season

Season tournaments

Standings

References

1938–39 NCAA Standings

External links
College Hockey Historical Archives

1938–39 United States collegiate men's ice hockey season
College